Close House is a village in County Durham, in England. It is situated a short distance to the north of Shildon, near to Eldon and Coundon Grange. In the 2001 census Close House had a population of 296.

The famed Gilbert and Sullivan star John Reed was born here in 1916.

References

External links

Villages in County Durham